A chitalishte (. Derives from the verb "чета" - "to read" or "читател" - "reader") is a typical Bulgarian public institution and building that fulfills several functions at once, such as a community centre, library, and a theatre. It is also used as an educational institution, where people of all ages can enroll in foreign language, dance, music and other courses. In this function they could be compared to the folk high schools of Northern Europe. Some larger urban chitalishta are comparable to 92nd Street Y in New York City. 

The term chitalishte combines the Bulgarian Slavic root, chital- ("reading") and the suffix -ishte (a place where preceding verb happens). Thus chitalishte literally means "reading room," a place where books are kept for public use.   

The chitalishta of the 19th and early 20th century had a crucial role in preserving and developing Bulgarian culture and thus played an important role during the Bulgarian National Revival. The first institutions of this kind emerged towards the end of the Ottoman era, in 1856 in the towns of Shumen, Lom and Svishtov. Later, the chitalishte became an important multi-purpose institution in villages and smaller towns. Today, chitalishta are less widely spread and have decreasingly critical roles, mostly due to lack of funding. They are evolving and adapting by also hosting public events, and housing cinema halls and other modern organisations.

In December 2017 the Bulgarian Chitalishte was Selected on the Register of Good Safeguarding Practices by UNESCO.

References

See also
 Narodny dim, the Ukrainian equivalent

Bulgarian culture
Social history of Bulgaria
Bulgarian National Revival
Libraries by subject
Cultural centers
Community centres